The  is a coal-fired thermal power station operated by the Sōma Kyōdō Power Co., Ltd.  in the city of Sōma, Fukushima, Japan. The facility is located on the Pacific coast of Honshu. The Sōma Kyōdō Power Co., Ltd is a 50-50 joint venture between Tohoku Electric and JERA.

History
Unit 1 of the Shinchi Thermal Power Station started operations in July 1994, followed by Unit 2 in July 1995. Each unit uses a super critical steam turbine with a rated output of 1000 MW, with imported coal as the primary fuel source, and with heavy oil and light oil usable as auxiliary sources of fuel. Biomass (wood pellets) were introduced from March 2015 to address the environmental issue  of carbon emissions.  The main smoke stack of the plant has a height of 200 meters, and can be seen from as far away as the city of Sendai in clear weather.

Operations were temporarily suspended due to damage caused by the Tōhoku earthquake and tsunami in March 2011, but test operations were resumed on December 2011. 

The area surrounding the power plant is being developed as an industrial park.

Plant details

See also 

 Energy in Japan
 List of power stations in Japan

External links
Tohoku Electric list of major power stations
Official home page

1994 establishments in Japan
Energy infrastructure completed in 1994
Coal-fired power stations in Japan
Biofuel power stations in Japan
Sōma, Fukushima
Buildings and structures in Fukushima Prefecture